A railway is a means of transport.

Railway, Railways or The Railway may also refer to:

Arts
 The Railway, an 1873 painting by Édouard Manet, also known as Gare Saint-Lazare
 The Railway (novel), a 2006 novel by Hamid Ismailov
 The Railway (poem), an 1864 poem by Nikolai Nekrasov
 Railways (film), a 2010 Japanese film
 The Railway: Keeping Britain On Track, a 2013 British TV documentary series 
 The Railway Series, a British books series
 Railways Africa, a magazine covering rail transport in Africa and the Middle East
 Railways Illustrated, a British magazine

Hotels, pubs and clubs
 The Railway, Altrincham, a pub in Cheshire, England
 The Railway Hotel, Hua Hin, a hotel in Hua Hin, Thailand
 The Railway Hotel, Southend, a pub in Essex, England
 Railway Club, historic nightclub and music venue in Vancouver, Canada

Sports

India
 Railways Cricket Association, see Railways Sports Promotion Board
 Railways cricket team, one of several types of sports teams in India referred to as Indian Railways
 Railways football team, a football (soccer) team in India
 Railways Handball Team, a sports team in India
 Railways Sports Promotion Board, a sports governing body in India

Elsewhere
 Railways Football Club, a modern Albany (Western Australia) sports team
 Railways Football Club, an Australian sports league established 1896, see Goldfields Football League
 Railways Ground, a stadium in Pakistan
 Railways Stadium, the former name of Godfrey 'Ucar' Chitalu 107 Stadium in Zambia
 Railway, informal name for a team in the Railway Union Sports Club, Dublin, Ireland

See also
 Rail (disambiguation)
 Railroad (disambiguation) (a railway in United States English)
 British Railways, a former name for British Rail
 Railways UK, see Rail transport in the United Kingdom
 Railways Minister (India), see Minister of Railways (India)
 Railways Board, the Indian Railway Board, see Indian Railways
 Train wreck, a railway disaster
 Rail transport in China
 Railways of Greece, re rail transport in Greece
 Railways Act, laws relating to railways